Dry Shoal, an exposed sandbar to the north and east of Muskeget Island in the US state of Massachusetts, is a hazard to navigation. Part of the Muskeget Island group, Dry Shoal, was once larger. Now separated from Muskeget by a stretch of fairly shallow water, it is accessible by kayakers, and it is possible to walk there from Muskeget, but only at moon neap tide.  It is known for its seal-nesting sites.

From Dry Shoal, one can see the eastern shore of Chappaquiddick Island (from Wasque Point to Cape Poge).  One may also see Great Point, on the northern tip of Nantucket Island.  Dry Shoal, which has no permanent human population and no structures, is part of Nantucket County, Massachusetts.

Landforms of Nantucket, Massachusetts
Barrier islands of Massachusetts